Jury Nullification: The Evolution of a Doctrine, by Clay Conrad, is one of the major book-length treatments of jury nullification. The Federal Lawyer noted, "Conrad provides...a comprehensive overview of jury nullification in historical, substantive, policy, and practical terms." The book surveys the history of jury nullification, describing how it has changed with cases such as Sparf v. United States and with the advent of death-qualified juries. It ends with a chapter of advice for those pursuing a nullification-based defense.

References

1998 non-fiction books
American non-fiction books
English-language books
Law books
Jury nullification